Romulus Glacier is a glacier, 7 nautical miles (13 km) long and 2 nautical miles (3.7 km) wide, which flows from the north slopes of Mount Lupa westward to Rymill Bay between the Blackwall Mountains and Black Thumb, on the west coast of Graham Land. First surveyed in 1936 by the British Graham Land Expedition (BGLE) under Rymill. Resurveyed in 1948-49 by the Falkland Islands Dependencies Survey (FIDS), who so named it for its association with Remus Glacier, whose head lies near the head of this glacier.

Glaciers of Fallières Coast